St Mary the Virgin Church is a deconsecrated and ruined church in the parish of Caerau with Ely, Cardiff, Wales. It was built in the 13th century on a Roman encampment and closed for the last time in 1973.

History
The ruins of the church stand on the site of Caerau Hillfort on a natural plateau at the Caerau end of a hill range extending from Leckwith to Caerau. The church is first mentioned in the Taxatio Ecclesiasticus of Pope Nicholas IV in 1291 and was probably built in 1260. Since then it has undergone many repairs and alterations. It was substantially rebuilt by the Rev Victor Jones in 1960-61. In 1973 it was closed and deconsecrated and has subsequently deteriorated into a ruin due to continuous vandalism. Since 1999 a group of former and current parishioners, the Friends of St Mary’s Church at Caerau, have been campaigning to preserve and commemorate the remains of the church.

Archaeologia Cambrensis in 1901 describes its 1848 state as follows:

The building became Grade II listed in 1980.

References

External links
 Friends of St. Mary's Church at Caerau
 Parish of Caerau with Ely

13th-century church buildings in Wales
Church ruins in Wales
Grade II listed ruins in Wales
Grade II listed churches in Cardiff
History of Cardiff
Former churches in Cardiff